Shooters is a 2002 British gangster drama film directed by Colin Teague and Glenn Durfort. It was filmed in London in 1999 and released theatrically in the UK on 25 January 2002. In addition to co-writing the screenplay, Andrew Howard and Louis Dempsey play the lead characters. Adrian Dunbar, Gerard Butler, Ioan Gruffudd, and Melanie Lynskey co-star. Shooters received mixed reviews from critics, but was praised for its gritty authenticity.

Plot synopsis
After six years behind bars, Gilly (Dempsey) wants to settle down and live a quiet life.  But it is not to be.  He is released from prison only to find that his crime partner, "J" (Howard), has invested all their money in a massive array of submachine guns, forcing Gilly back into a life of crime. Their last deal goes down in seven days, but the way things are going, Gilly is not sure he can hold out that long.

Cast
 Adrian Dunbar as Max Bell 
 Andrew Howard as "J"/Justin
 Louis Dempsey as Gilly 
 Gerard Butler as Jackie Junior 
 Jason Hughes as Charlie Franklin 
 Matthew Rhys as Eddie
 Ioan Gruffudd as Freddie
 Jamie Sweeney as Skip
 Melanie Lynskey as Marie 
 Emma Fielding as Detective Inspector Sarah Pryce
 David Kennedy as Detective Sergeant Dave Webb
 Joe Swash as Boy One
 Ranjit Krishnamma as Pac
 Nitin Ganatra as Ajay
 Walter Roberts as Jason
 Ted Nygh as Mickey
 Mike Martin as Vic
 Glenn Durfort as Glenn
 Treva Etienne as Benny
 Raquel Cassidy as Tess
 Stephen Evans as Pal
Tucker Stevens as Bodyguard 1
 Ali Wilson as Bodyguard 2 
 Adam Deacon as Drug Runner (uncredited)

References

External links
 
 
 

2002 films
British crime thriller films
2000s crime thriller films
American crime thriller films
Dutch crime thriller films
Hood films
Films shot in London
2000s English-language films
2000s American films
2000s British films